Rechenberger Rot is a river of Baden-Württemberg ( Germany ). It flows into the Jagst near Jagstzell.

See also
List of rivers of Baden-Württemberg

References

Rivers of Baden-Württemberg
Rivers of Germany